Wolftracks is the tenth album by John Kay and Steppenwolf, released in 1982 (see 1982 in music). It was originally released only in Canada and Australia. The album was the first new studio album in six years for John Kay, featuring a new line-up of Steppenwolf and Kay renaming the group accordingly.

Background
In 1980, John Kay reclaimed the Steppenwolf name, touring as “John Kay & Steppenwolf.” The album Wolftracks, the first after the band reformed, was recorded "live" in the studio on a 2-track digital recorder, which was then a new medium.

Track listing
Side one
"All I Want Is All You Got" (John Kay) – 3:55
"Time" (Kay, Michael Palmer, Kevin Kern) – 3:31
"None of the Above" (Kay, M. Palmer, Steven Palmer) – 5:59
"You" (Kay) – 3:50
"Every Man for Himself" (Kay) – 3:19
"Five Finger Discount" (Kay) – 4:36
Side two
"Hold Your Head Up" (Rod Argent, Chris White) – 3:42
"Hot Night in a Cold Town" (Rick Littlefield, Geoffrey Cushing-Murray) – 3:20
"Down To Earth" (Kim Fowley, Ross Wilson) – 3:00
"For Rock-N-Roll" (Kay) – 3:42
"The Balance" (Kay) – 6:15

Personnel

John Kay and Steppenwolf
 John Kay – guitar, vocals
 Michael Wilk – keyboards, vocals
 Michael Palmer – lead guitar, vocals
 Welton Gite – bass
 Steven Palmer – drums, percussion, vocals

Additional musicians
 Brett Tuggle, George Biondo – backing vocals

Technical
 John Kay – producer
 Richard Podolor – producer (track 1)
 Kevin Kern – engineer, assistant producer
 Rich Feldman – engineer
 Mark Ettel, Steve Crimmel – assistant engineers
 Bruce Leek, Richard Donaldson – mastering
 Drennon Studio – art direction
 John Exley – photography

References

1982 albums
Steppenwolf (band) albums